Iron Will is a 1994 American adventure film.  It is based on the true story of a 1917 dog-sled race from Winnipeg, Manitoba to Saint Paul, Minnesota, a 522-mile-long stretch and part of the "Red River-St. Paul Sports Carnival Derby." It is directed by Charles Haid, and stars Mackenzie Astin, Kevin Spacey, David Ogden Stiers, George Gerdes, Brian Cox, John Terry, Penelope Windust and August Schellenberg.

In the film, a teenager is thrust into adulthood when desperate family circumstances compel him to enter a lucrative yet dangerous cross-country dog race.  Despite numerous odds against him, including harsh weather, hostile competitors and uncooperative dogs, he strives to continue forward; getting help from unlikely sources along the way, he is shocked to learn that not only he, but the whole country, is inspired and hopeful to see his own "iron will" come to fruition at the finish line.

Plot
In 1917, 17-year-old Will Stoneman (Mackenzie Astin) is a mail-runner for his small South Dakota town and an apprentice carpenter for his father Jack (John Terry), who creates furniture and also runs the family farm.  After delivering the town mail one day, Will opens a college letter addressed to him and sees that he was accepted to his desired school. Despite his happiness at being accepted, he hesitates to leave his family responsibilities behind; Jack however encourages Will to attend college and to chase his dreams, and to not let fear stand his way. While returning with Will one day from a lumber run with their sled dogs, Jack drowns in a mushing accident when his sled overturns into a river; he sacrifices his own life to prevent Will, whose team was just ahead and tied to his own sled, from being dragged into the water, too.  As the only son, now responsible for his mother Maggie (Penelope Windust) and his family's bill-indebted farm, Will despairs of college but protests when his mother plans to sell their valuable sled dogs. Knowing that his father was thinking of competing in an international dog-sled race with a cash prize that his father knew could save the farm, Will insists on making the attempt.

After a month of rigorous physical, mental and spiritual training from Native Indian farm hand Ned Dodd (August Schellenberg), Will travels to Winnipeg, Manitoba, Canada to enter the race. The race's principal sponsor, railroad magnate J.W. Harper (David Ogden Stiers), initially refuses his entry as too late.  American news reporter Harry Kingsley (Kevin Spacey) sees the youngster as his opportunity to win headlines and gives Will the extra money he lacks to pay the late fee, which Harper reluctantly accepts rather than be criticized in American newspapers. The rich race sponsors and the highly experienced international mushing champions scoff at the brash boy's apparently silly hopes of being real competition for them.

During the race, Will's energy and determination wins the grudging respect of the international mushers and immensely pleases Harper, who never expected Will to last for more than a day in the race. Kingsley writes admiring articles gushing about Will's courage and competitive zeal (nicknaming him "Iron Will" to bolster his public image as an American hero), but his stories, written by a cynical reporter, languish on back pages while the world focuses on the European War. As Will follows Ned's training advice to "run longer, sleep less," start earlier and race persistently for the long hours and many days of the over 500 mile race through subzero blizzards and lonely snow-covered forests, he endures brutal cold, steep mountains, treacherous river passages and various other obstacles. Will becomes increasingly tired and sick, especially after he sacrifices his lead one day to save the life of an Icelandic fellow competitor who was felled in a remote area by the influenza beginning to sweep the world.

Upon learning Will's intention to win, Harper becomes understanding of him and refuses to drop him out of the race because he experienced similar things as Will did in the past before his own financial success. One of the race's co-sponsors Angus McTeague (Brian Cox) offers a bribe to a particularly brutal Swedish competitor Borg Guillarson (George Gerdes) to do whatever it takes to force the kid out of the race. The intimidating racer eliminates a number of other mushers by underhanded tactics. He also takes a special malevolent interest in the innocent young man, mocking Will, threatening him and eventually releasing the meanest of his large dogs to attack and attempt to kill Will's lead dog, Gus. Will stands up against this active attempted sabotage by Borg and also realizes that his supposed sponsor Kingsley is just using him as a pawn to justify embellished articles which the veteran reporter hopes will win him front-page status and a promotion from the cold North to his paper's Headquarters. However, when McTeague, who has funded the attempted sabotage of Will's attempts so he can win an immense side bet, repeatedly tries to bribe Will to drop out of the race, Kingsley overhears the final offer, defends Will's honor and throws McTeague out. By standing up for the plucky boy, the jaded reporter suddenly lost some of his cynicism and found himself trying to help Will for purely unselfish reasons. Will accepts the gesture and the two make amends.

On the last day of the race, reporter Kingsley becomes genuinely concerned when he sees how serious Will's physical condition is and can barely move. Kingsley urges the battered and exhausted Will to drop out of the race and see a doctor, but Will insists on finishing the race. Will finds himself following Borg on a dangerous shortcut to the finish line.  This hazardous frosty course alongside runs a turbulent river, just like the trail that took the life of Will's father.  Before this, every time Will confronted a frozen lake or icy riverside trail, he avoided those paths out of fear over what happened to his father. This time, Will remembers Ned's advice and finds the courage to trust his dog team and risk the water hazards as Gus recovers enough to finish the race. Borg takes the lead by continually whipping his dogs, but they quit from exhaustion and attack him when he attempts to brutalize them into continuing.  Will sees Borg being savaged by his team and scares them off, as he races by on the dangerous shortcut. 

The large crowd waiting at the finish line suddenly sees Will come into view with a huge lead. Will's sled overturns near the finish line and he collapses, exhausted. Then Ned awakens the spirit of his father's dog Gus with a familiar whistle with the crowd following suit. While the other racers close in, Will struggles to stand back up again and cross the finish line just ahead of the others. Falling to the ground, unable to stand, he is helped up by his fellow competitors and falls into his mother's arms in an embrace. Spectators, along with Kingsley, Harper and other race officials and reporters surround Will, applauding him for his heroic victory.

Cast

 Mackenzie Astin as Will Stoneman
 Kevin Spacey as Harry Kingsley
 David Ogden Stiers as J.W. Harper
 August Schellenberg as Ned Dodd
 Brian Cox as Angus McTeague
 George Gerdes as Borg Guillarson
 John Terry as Jack Stoneman
 Penelope Windust as Maggie Stoneman
 Rex Linn as Joe McPherson
 Richard Riehle as Burton
 Beau as Gus

Production

Much of the film was shot on location in Minnesota, mostly along the Lake Superior shoreline as well as the cities of Cloquet and Floodwood. Although the race takes place between Winnipeg and Saint Paul, neither city actually appears in the film. The Winnipeg starting point for the race was filmed in Duluth, Minnesota near the Historic Old Central High School. The Lake Superior Railroad Museum, also located in Duluth, portrayed the St. Paul train station's finish line, and they also provided their active steam locomotive of that time Duluth and Northern Minnesota 14. Due to the general lack of mountains in Minnesota (excepting the Sawtooth Mountains), scenes in which Will goes through mountainous terrain were filmed in Montana. Additional footage was shot in Superior, Wisconsin as well as Brookston, Minnesota.

Box office
In its opening weekend, Iron Will took in $5,313,406. The film made a total domestic gross of $21,006,361.

Reception 
On Rotten Tomatoes, the film has an approval rating of 67%, based on 15 reviews, with an average rating of 6.2/10. On Metacritic, the film has a score of 58 out of 100, based on 20 critics, indicating "mixed or average reviews". Audiences polled by CinemaScore gave the film a rare "A+" grade.
	
Roger Ebert of the Chicago Sun-Times gave it 2 out of 4 and wrote: "Iron Will is an Identikit plot, put together out of standard pieces. Even the scenery looks generic; there's none of the majesty of Disney's genuinely inspired dog movie, White Fang."

See also
 Survival film

References

External links
 
 
 Historical Account of the 1917 Winnipeg to Saint Paul Race

1994 films
Walt Disney Pictures films
1990s adventure films
American films based on actual events
Films set in Minnesota
Films set in North Dakota
Films set in South Dakota
Films set in 1917
Films shot in Maine
Films shot in Minnesota
Films shot in Montana
Northern (genre) films
Films with screenplays by John Michael Hayes
Films scored by Joel McNeely
Mushing films
Films directed by Charles Haid
1994 directorial debut films
American children's adventure films
1990s English-language films
1990s American films